Matsuda (written:  lit. "pine ricefield") is a Japanese surname. Notable people with the surname include:

, Japanese badminton athlete
Eiji Matsuda (1894–1978), Mexican botanist
Fujio Matsuda (1924–2020), president of the University of Hawaii
, Japanese actor
, member of Travis Japan
, Japanese badminton player
, Japanese racing driver and television personality
, Japanese baseball player
, member of the Diet of Japan
, general in the Imperial Japanese Army
Jeff Matsuda, animator for Jackie Chan Adventures and The Batman
, founder of Mazda Motor Corporation
, Japanese ice hockey player
, Japanese educator
Mari Matsuda (born 1956), American law school professor
, Japanese ice hockey player
, Japanese actress
, Japanese footballer
, Japanese swimmer
, Japanese professional baseball player
Rika Matsuda, survivor of Korean Air Flight 801
, Japanese footballer
Riku Matsuda (disambiguation), multiple people
, Japanese author and martial artist
, Japanese actor, Yusaku Matsuda's son
, Japanese pop singer
, Japanese women's professional footballer 
Shinya Matsuda, voice actor
, Japanese actor, Yusaku Matsuda's son
So Matsuda (born 1991), Japanese Olympic mogulist
, professional wrestler
, Japanese cyclist
, Japanese swimmer
, Japanese shot putter
, Japanese actor and voice actor
, Japanese figure skater
, Japanese rower
 actor

Fictional characters
Takato Matsuda (Takato Matsuki), a character in the anime Digimon Tamers. (Matsuda is the character's name in the Japanese version)
Touta Matsuda, a character in the manga and anime series Death Note.
Takeyoshi Matsuda, a character in War and Destiny.
Yasuke Matsuda, a character in the light novel Danganronpa/Zero
Sean Matsuda, a character in Capcom's Street Fighter franchise.

See also
Mazda

Japanese-language surnames